Ecovía is a bus rapid transit (BRT) system in Monterrey, Nuevo Leon that began operations in January 2014.

Overview
As of 2014 Ecovía consists of a single route that runs 30 kilometers serving three different municipalities of the Monterrey Metropolitan area: Monterrey, San Nicolas and Guadalupe.

Ecovía buses operate within a fully dedicated right of way (busway).  Buses offer free wifi access. 

Ecovía stations include off-board fare collection and platform level with the bus floor.

See also
List of bus rapid transit systems
Metrorrey

References

External links
Ecovia Official Site

Bus rapid transit in Mexico
Transportation in Monterrey
2014 establishments in Mexico